Lary Alan Schulhof (born July 15, 1942) is an American former competition swimmer and national, Olympic and world record-holder.

Schulhof was born in Muncie, Indiana.  He attended Indiana University, where he swam for coach Doc Counsilman's Indiana Hoosiers swimming and diving team in National Collegiate Athletic Association (NCAA) competition from 1962 to 1964 but could not participate in the NCAA Championships due to the NCAA's 4 year ALL SPORTS
probation of I.U. for football recruiting violations. He was a two time national butterfly AAU champion and won eight international butterfly championships in Japan and Europe including East Germany between 1962 and 1964. 

Schulhof represented the United States at the 1964 Summer Olympics in Tokyo, Japan.  He swam for the gold medal-winning U.S. team in the preliminary heats of the men's 4×100-meter freestyle relay.  Under the 1964 Olympic swimming rules, however, he did not receive a medal because he did not compete in the event final. He was inducted into the Indiana University Athletic Hall of Fame in 2012. 

He went on to become a practicing Neurological Surgeon in Asheville N.C. from 1975 until his retirement in 2009.

See also
 List of Indiana University (Bloomington) people
 World record progression 4 × 100 metres medley relay

References

External links
 

1942 births
Living people
American male freestyle swimmers
World record setters in swimming
Indiana Hoosiers men's swimmers
Olympic swimmers of the United States
Sportspeople from Muncie, Indiana
Swimmers at the 1964 Summer Olympics